A tip jar, also known as a tip cup is a container, commonly a glass jar, into which customers can put a gratuity. A tip jar is usually situated at the point-of-sale at many businesses.  Although common in many countries around the world, tip jars in food and drink establishments are ubiquitous in the United States.

The tip jar has become a source of controversy. Customers may feel discouraged from patronizing establishments using them. They may also feel that tip jars are inappropriate at certain types of establishments such as movie-theater concession counters, dry cleaners, take-out restaurants, gym locker rooms or grocery bagger's work stations. Many feel social pressure to use them, or that they are paying too high a total price when purchasing a simple item.

History
The tip jar may have originated hundreds of years ago. A 1946 editorial in Life claimed that 
English taverns used prominently displayed urns for tips that were labelled 'To Insure Promptitude'. However, there is no historical evidence to support this.

Proceeds
Usually, the accumulated tips are divided among all of the workers during the shift.
 In one case, a court case resulted when supervisors and assistant managers claimed that they were entitled to a share at a Starbucks coffee outlet in New York.

At piano bars
A pianist at a piano bar may earn tips from a tip jar to supplementing the normally small salary. This may be a basket, jar, or oversized brandy snifter placed on or near the piano. Tips may be given by customers who have been played a song that was requested by being written on a napkin.

Credit card tip jar
For convenience, a digital tip jar may be provided. This allows customers to swipe their credit card in a simulated tip jar. The card reader is set to charge a certain amount, normally one dollar. Customer wishing to tip more can swipe the card numerous times.

Quotes
It is common for tip jars to display a humorous or compelling quote to encourage tipping.

Theft
Tip jars or the contents within are sometimes stolen, with such thefts being the subject of videos and newspaper articles. Some tip jars are box-shaped, and have a locking lid with a slot through which the tip is inserted. The entire tip jar may also be secured on a tether to prevent theft.

In popular culture
A main theme of the Seinfeld episode "The Calzone" involves George Costanza trying to retrieve money he put into a tip jar because none of the staff saw him put it in.  He does get caught taking his money back out, however, and is banished from the restaurant.

See also

Mandatory tipping

References

Money containers